Datuk Seri Nor Hisham bin Ahmad Dahlan (born 1957) is a Malaysian civil servant who served as 12th Mayor of Kuala Lumpur from 2018 to 2020.

Honours
 :
 Knight Commander of the Order of the Crown of Selangor (D.P.M.S.) - Dato’ (2013)
 :
 Grand Commander of the Order of the Territorial Crown (S.M.W.) – Datuk Seri (2021)

References 

Mayors of Kuala Lumpur
Knights Commander of the Order of the Crown of Selangor
Living people
1957 births